Penstemon triflorus, Heller's beardtongue or Heller's penstemon, is a penstemon notable for its showy, purple blossoms.

Distribution and habitat

Heller's beardtongue grows on the Edwards Plateau of Texas.

triflorus
Flora of Texas